Jacqueline Hong-Ngoc Nguyen (born May 25, 1965) is an American lawyer who serves as a United States circuit judge of the U.S. Court of Appeals for the Ninth Circuit. She previously served as a U.S. district judge of the U.S. District Court for the Central District of California from 2009 to 2012 and as a California superior court judge from 2002 to 2009.

Early life and education 

Born Hong-Ngoc Thi Nguyen in Da Lat, Vietnam, Nguyen moved to the United States when she was 10, after the fall of the Republic of Vietnam in 1975. The daughter of a South Vietnamese army major who had worked closely with U.S. intelligence officials, Nguyen moved with her family first to an army tent at Marine Corps Base Camp Pendleton, where she lived for several months. They ultimately settled in the La Crescenta-Montrose area of Los Angeles. Her family later opened a doughnut shop in Glendale, California, where Nguyen worked throughout high school and college.

Nguyen earned her Artium Baccalaureus degree in English in 1987 from Occidental College. She then earned a Juris Doctor from UCLA School of Law in 1991.

Professional career 

From 1991 until 1995, Nguyen worked in private law practice, specializing in civil litigation as a litigation associate at the firm Musick, Peeler & Garrett. In particular, she focused on commercial disputes, intellectual property and construction-defect cases. From 1995 until August 2002, Nguyen served as an Assistant United States Attorney in the Central District of California.  She joined the U.S. Attorney's office in its Public Corruption and Government Fraud section, overseeing United States Department of Defense fraud prosecutions. In her final years in the U.S. Attorney's office, Nguyen also held the role of Deputy Chief of the General Crimes section, training new prosecutors in the Central District. In August 2002, Nguyen was appointed by then-California Gov. Gray Davis to be a Superior Court of Los Angeles County judge. Nguyen became the first-ever Vietnamese-American woman appointed to the Los Angeles County Superior Court. She had been based in Alhambra, California.

Federal judicial service

District court service 
On July 31, 2009, President Barack Obama nominated Nguyen to a seat on the United States District Court for the Central District of California, vacated when Nora Margaret Manella left the federal judiciary to join the California Courts of Appeal in 2006.  Senator Dianne Feinstein had recommended Nguyen's nomination. On September 23, Nguyen appeared before the Senate Judiciary Committee, which reported her nomination on October 15. On December 1, 2009, the United States Senate voted 97–0 to confirm Nguyen. She received her commission on December 4, 2009. On May 15, 2012, her service on the District Court terminated due to her elevation to the Court of Appeals.

Ninth Circuit service 
On September 22, 2011, President Obama nominated Nguyen to the United States Court of Appeals for the Ninth Circuit. The Senate confirmed Nguyen by a 91–3 vote on May 7, 2012. She received her commission on May 14, 2012.
She is the first Asian-American female to serve as a federal appellate judge. She is also the first Vietnamese-American federal judge, and the first Asian-Pacific American female federal judge in California. In 2012, she was speculated to be a candidate for the Supreme Court.
In February 2016, The New York Times identified her as a potential nominee to replace Justice Antonin Scalia.

Notable cases

On September 3, 2015, Nguyen granted relief to Edin Avendano-Hernandez, a Transgender Mexican, because she showed adequate proof that she would likely face torture if deported back to Mexico. Nguyen was joined by Harry Pregerson and Barrington D. Parker, Jr.

On December 29, 2017, Nguyen partially dissented when Stephen Reinhardt and Harry Pregerson blocked an execution due to the mental health of the criminal defendant.

On June 6, 2019, Nguyen ruled against Hyundai and Kia, ruling that they lied about their fuel economy and did not show that the California law would not apply.

Personal life
Nguyen's husband, Pio S. Kim, was also a federal prosecutor.

See also
 Barack Obama Supreme Court candidates
 Joe Biden Supreme Court candidates
 List of Asian American jurists
 List of first women lawyers and judges in California
 List of first women lawyers and judges in the United States

References

External links 

|-

1965 births
21st-century American judges
Academics of Vietnamese descent
American people of Vietnamese descent
American jurists of Asian descent
Assistant United States Attorneys
California state court judges
Judges of the United States Court of Appeals for the Ninth Circuit
Judges of the United States District Court for the Central District of California
Living people
Occidental College alumni
People from La Crescenta-Montrose, California
United States court of appeals judges appointed by Barack Obama
United States district court judges appointed by Barack Obama
UCLA School of Law alumni
21st-century American women judges